Greenock Morton Football Club is a Scottish professional football club, which plays in the Scottish Championship. The club was founded as Morton Football Club in 1874, making it one of the oldest senior Scottish clubs. Morton was renamed Greenock Morton in 1994 to celebrate the links with its home town of Greenock.

Morton won the Scottish Cup in 1922, and achieved its highest league finish in 1916–17, as runners-up to champions Celtic. Morton holds the record for the most promotions to and relegations from the top flight (10 promotions and 10 relegations), but has not competed in the top flight of the Scottish football league system since 1988. In 2014–15, Morton won its tenth league title in all divisions by winning the Scottish League One championship on the final day.

History

19th century 
Morton Football Club was established in 1874. In the early 1870s the popularity of football was growing, with many clubs being established around Scotland. At the club's inaugural meeting, the first recorded words were "that this club be called Morton Football Club". The true reason for the name 'Morton' remains unclear, though the general consensus is that the club was named after the 'Morton Terrace', a row of houses next to the original playing field, where some of the players lived. The name would be altered in 1994 to read 'Greenock Morton Football Club', to celebrate the club's links with its hometown, though it is still almost universally referred to as 'Morton'.

Morton was one of the founding members of the old Second Division, formed in 1893, and finished 8th in its first season. Morton first gained promotion to the old First Division in 1899–1900, and finished 4th in its first season there.

20th century 

Morton's greatest success came in its 1–0 defeat of Rangers in the 1922 Scottish Cup Final. Calum McGinn scored the winning goal directly from a free kick in the 11th minute. Right after the match Morton boarded a train for Hartlepool to play the local side in a pre-arranged friendly match. The celebrations were delayed until the following Wednesday when 10,000 locals turned out at Cappielow Park to celebrate.

Morton has made two other major cup final appearances. On Saturday 17 April 1948, Morton drew 1–1 with Rangers in the Scottish Cup Final. Morton's goal was a free kick scored by Jimmy White. The match was replayed on Wednesday 21 April. This time Rangers won 1–0 after extra time. The goal was said to be highly controversial because it was claimed that Morton goalkeeper Jimmy Cowan was blinded by the flash of a camera. These matches were significant because of the huge crowds they attracted. The first match was played in front of 132,629. The replay, in front of 133,750, was at the time a British record attendance for a midweek match.

Morton's third and final major cup final to date was in the League Cup, played on Saturday, 26 October 1963. As in its previous two final appearances, Morton's opponent was once again Rangers. The Glasgow side won by 5 goals to nil(HT: 0–0) in front of 106,000 supporters.

During the Second World War 'guest' players were common at clubs throughout Great Britain. Morton was particularly fortunate in this respect in that two of English football's greatest ever players turned out at Cappielow. Sir Stanley Matthews and Tommy Lawton made several guest appearances for Morton. When Morton reached the 1948 Scottish Cup Final both players sent telegrams wishing good luck to their former club. Matthews simply said 'I am delighted to see Morton reach the final of the Scottish Cup'. Lawton's was more expressive, he said 'Memories of happy days during the war at Cappielow compel me to wish the Morton manager & the boys all the best of luck in their cup final at Hampden'.

To date Morton has played in a European Club Competition once. After finishing 6th in Scotland's top division in 1967–68 Morton qualified for the European Inter-Cities Fairs Cup (now the UEFA Europa League). Drawn to play Chelsea, the club was eliminated at the first hurdle after a 5–0 defeat at Stamford Bridge and a 4–3 defeat at Cappielow.

In 1992–93 Morton lost 3–2 to Hamilton Academical in the Scottish Challenge Cup Final in front of 7,391 fans. The final was played at Love Street, the home of Morton's arch rivals St Mirren.

21st century 
After experiencing financial problems the team was relegated from the First Division at the end of the 2000–01 season after a six-year stay and was put into administration. The club's financial problems continued and a second successive relegation followed. In season 2002–03, Morton's first ever season in the Third Division, the club's financial situation was resolved by the takeover by chairman Douglas Rae. Rae appointed John McCormack as manager, and the team won the Third Division championship at the first attempt, confirming its position with a 1–0 victory over Peterhead in front of a then Third Division record crowd of 8,497 people.

After a strong start to the 2003–04 season, the team fell away after the turn of the year, and finished in 4th place, well outside the promotion places. This came after being 12 points ahead in the Championship race at the half-way stage. This led to unfounded allegations that some players had placed large bets on nearest rivals Airdrie United to win the league, which Airdrie eventually did.

Jim McInally was announced as McCormack's successor, and in his first season as manager the club failed to gain promotion to the First Division by a single point, finishing behind Stranraer in 3rd place.

Morton failed to gain promotion to the First Division during the 2005–06 season. Finishing 2nd was not enough, as the SFL playoffs meant that only the championship-winning team would be promoted automatically. Gretna won the division, so Morton entered play-offs along with Peterhead (3rd), Partick Thistle (4th), and Stranraer (9th in Division One). Morton's first play-off match was against Peterhead, and the Greenock side was defeated 1–0 over two legs, the only goal a penalty in the second match at Balmoor.

The following season, a week after a 9–1 defeat of Forfar Athletic at Cappielow Park, Morton achieved promotion to the First Division, and went on to become Second Division Champions.

Jim McInally resigned on 11 February 2008 after a run of poor results allowed Morton to slip into 9th place in the First Division and was replaced by Davie Irons, with Derek Collins joining him as Assistant Manager. Morton battled relegation for most of the season and survived on the final day with a 3–0 victory against Partick Thistle, to avoid the relegation playoff by a single goal. Irons was sacked in September 2009 and replaced October by James Grady until the end of the season.
Grady was removed from the club in May 2010, and replaced by Allan Moore. Allan Moore was sacked after a 5–1 defeat at home to Livingston on 23 November 2013. His replacement Kenny Shiels was given a contract until the end of season 2014–2015, but failed to reverse the slide towards relegation from the Scottish Championship, which became a reality on 12 April 2014 after a 2–0 away defeat by Alloa Athletic. Shiels resigned after a 10–2 defeat by Hamilton Accies.

After the resignation of Shiels, Jim Duffy was appointed as manager. He won the Scottish League One to return the club the Championship at the first time of asking. This league victory earned Morton's tenth league title, making it the joint third most crowned league champions in Scotland along with Hibernian, but behind Rangers (57) and Celtic (51). Duffy was sacked in April 2018 after the club finished in 7th place in the Championship after a promising start. At the end of the 2017–18 season, Chairman Douglas Rae retired after 17 years and handed the role to his son Crawford, before dying less than two months later.

Jim Duffy was replaced by Ray McKinnon in May 2018 on a one-year contract; however McKinnon left to join league rivals Falkirk after just three months, being replaced by ex-reserve team manager Jonatan Johansson on a two-year deal.

Colours 
The team's home strip is traditionally a blue and white hooped shirt with white shorts and white socks, though season 2006–07 saw the team playing a blue and white striped shirt with white shorts and blue socks. Short-lived yet distinctive designs have been used over the years, including sky blue and white stripes in the style of the Argentina national team and even a blue Morton tartan. The away strip tends to vary much more: for the 2003–04 season it was an all yellow outfit, changing in 2004–05 to all white, which in turn became the 3rd team strip in 2005–06, with the special re-issue of the blue Morton tartan strip.

For the 2021–22 season, the club issued a commemorative 'throwback' home kit with a similar design to that worn in their 1922 Scottish Cup Final victory, with no sponsor.

Stadium 

Morton's stadium is Cappielow Park in Greenock, a ground the club has occupied since 1879. In December 2008, Morton purchased the Reid Kerr sponsored east stand from local rivals St Mirren for £50,000, to improve the away end at Cappielow.

The area currently behind the western goal (upon which the new stand will be built) is known as the Wee Dublin End, which contains non-backed bench seating, converted from the old terracing that once stood there. The main stand contains plastic bucket seating to replace the old wooden benches that were a fixture of the ground until the late 1990s. The "Cowshed" lies to the north of the pitch; formerly a fully terraced arena for both home and away supporters (complete with segregation fence down the middle), it is now for home supporters only, with much of the frontal terracing removed, and plastic bucket seats occupying its place. The segregation fence no longer exists, and the whole area is used by home supporters. Behind the eastern goal is the "Sinclair Street" end, with uncovered terracing.

Supporters and rivalries
Greenock Morton has several supporters' clubs based in Greenock and the surrounding towns. The main clubs are The Andy Ritchie Travel Club, The Prince of Wales Travel Club, The Greenock Morton Supporters Club, The Gourock Morton Supporters (Formerly The Albert Hotel Morton Supporters Club) and The Spinnaker Hotel Supporters Club.

The club has a fierce rivalry with neighbours St Mirren, with whom they contest the Renfrewshire derby. It is a rivalry which sees a large amount of animosity between the two sets of fans.

The club also contests smaller rivalries with Partick Thistle and Falkirk.

The club shares friendships with AC Reggiana and PEC Zwolle.

League participation 

First Tier: 1900–1927, 1929–1933, 1937–1938, 1946–1949, 1950–1952, 1964–1966, 1967–1975, 1978–1983, 1984–1985, 1987–1988
Second Tier: 1893–1900, 1927–1929, 1933–1937, 1938–39, 1949–1950, 1952–1964, 1966–1967, 1975–1978, 1983–1984, 1985–1987, 1988–1994, 1995–2001, 2007–2014, 2015–present
Third Tier: 1994–1995, 2001–2002, 2003–2007, 2014–2015
Fourth Tier: 2002–2003

Honours

National honours 
 Scottish Cup
 Winners: 1921–22
 Runners-up: 1947–48
 Scottish League Cup
 Runners-up: 1963–64
 Scottish Challenge Cup
 Runners-up: 1992
 Scottish Football League
 Runners-up: 1916–17²
 Scottish First Division/Division Two
 Champions: (6) 1949–50¹, 1963–64¹, 1966–67¹, 1977–78, 1983–84, 1986–1987
 Runners-up: (4) 1899–1900¹, 1928–29¹, 1936–37¹, 2012–13
 Scottish Second Division/League One
 Champions: (3) 1994–95, 2006–07, 2014–15³
 Runners-up: 2005–06
 Scottish Third Division
 Champions: 2002–03

Minor honours 
 Renfrewshire Cup
 Winners: 52 times
 Runners-up: 42 times
 Great War Shield
 Winners: 1914–15
 Runners-up: 1917–18
Southern Football League
 Runners-up: 1942-43
 Southern League Cup
 Runners-up: 1941–42
 SFL Reserve League South
 Runners-up: 2012–13
 SPFL Development League West
 Champions: 2015–16, 2017-18
 Runners-up: 2016–17
 Club Academy Scotland U16/17 South/West League
 Champions: 2014–15
 Runners-up: 2015–16

¹ Known as Division II at the time 
² Known as Division I at the time 
³ Known as SPFL League One at the time

Records 
 Best league position – 2nd in First Division (Old) (1916–1917)
 Best Scottish Cup performance – winners (1921–1922)
 Best League Cup performance – runners-up (1963–1964)
 Best Challenge Cup performance – runners-up (1992–1993)
 Victory – 21–0 v Howwood (1886–87 Renfrewshire Cup)
 Defeat – 1–10 v Port Glasgow Athletic (5 May 1894), St Bernard's (14 October 1933)
 Home attendance – 23,500 v Celtic (1922)
 Goals in one season – Allan McGraw (58 in 1963–1964)
 Most league appearances – Derek Collins (534)
 Most league goals – Allan McGraw (117)
 Record signing – Janne Lindberg – £250k (including Marko Rajamäki) from MyPa-47
 Record sale – Derek Lilley – £500k to Leeds United

Players

Current squad

Out on loan

Coaching staff

Player records 
All statistics are for league matches, post-World War II.

Top league goalscorers by season (post war) 
In progress
Scottish unless stated

National Individual Honours 
 2016–17 – Jim Duffy (Ladbrokes Championship Manager of the Season)
 2014–15 – Declan McManus (SPFL League One Player of the Year)
 2002–03 – Alex Williams (SPFA Third Division Player of the Year)
 1994–95 – Derek McInnes (SPFA Second Division Player of the Year)
 1994–95 – Allan McGraw (SPFA Second Division Manager of the Year)
 1986–87 – Jim Holmes (SPFA First Division Player of the Year)
 1984–85 – Jim Duffy (SPFA Players' Player of the Year)
 1978–79 – Andy Ritchie (SFWA Footballer of the Year)

Recent internationals 
The last signed player to earn a full international cap whilst playing for Morton – Fouad Bachirou for Comoros in 2014.

The last signed Morton player to receive international honours for Scotland was Jai Quitongo in 2016, for the under-21 side.

Notable players 
To be included in this list players must have met one of the following criteria...
 Played over 100 league games for Morton
 Scored in a national cup final
 Managed the club after playing for them
 Been from a nation outwith the British Isles
 Won full international honours

  Stephen Aitken
  Rowan Alexander
 Efe Ambrose
  George Anderson
  John Anderson
  Preben Arentoft
  Fouad Bachirou
  Roy Baines
  Darren Barr
  Per Bartram
  Eddie Beaton
  Carl Bertelsen
  John Boag
  Andre Boe
  Emilio Bottiglieri
  Karim Boukraa
  John Boyd
  David Brcic
  Charlie Brown
  Jock Buchanan
  Nicolas Caraux
  Artur Correia
  Dominic Cervi
  Kabba-Modou Cham
  Gert Christensen
  Lars Christensen
  Ian Clinging
  Derek Collins
  Jimmy Cowan
  Craig Coyle
  Martin Doak
  Jim Duffy
  Robert Earnshaw
  Dave Edwards
  Paul Fenwick
  Kevin Finlayson
  Markus Fjørtoft
  Ross Forbes
  John Fowler
  George French
  Luca Gasparotto
  Derek Gaston
  James Gillespie
  Stewart Greacen
  Bobby Gourlay
  Jimmy Gourlay
  James Grady
  Billy Gray
  Michal Habai
  Ryan Harding
  Joe Harper
  Paul Hartley
  Warren Hawke
  Davie Hayes
  Atli Thor Hedinsson
  Willie Hinshelwood
  Jim Holmes
  David Hopkin
  Bobby Houston
  Jim Hunter
  Roddy Hutchinson
  Dougie Imrie
  Jack Iredale
  Kyle Jacobs
  Bjarne Jensen
  Kai Johansen
  Justin Johnson
  Dougie Johnstone
  Joe Jordan
  Joel Kasubandi
  Dylan Kerr
  Jim Kiernan
  Lee Kilday
  Carl Kristensen
  Ricki Lamie
  Tommy Lawton
  Gudgeir Leifsson
  Derek Lilley
  Janne Lindberg
  Alec Linwood
  Adam Little
  David MacGregor
  John Madsen
  Alan Mahood
  John Maisano
  Marco Maisano
  Carsten Margaard
  Daniel Martins
  Joe Mason
  Stanley Matthews
  Ally Maxwell
  Jim McAlister
  Scott McArthur
  Steve McCahill
  Ian McDonald
  Tom MacGarrity
  Mark McGhee
  Allan McGraw
  Bob McGregor
  Derek McInnes
  Jock McIntyre
  Bobby McKay
  Andy McLaren
  Joe McLaughlin
  Alex McNab
  John McNeil
  Craig McPherson
  Dave McPherson
  Parfait Medou-Otye
  Chris Millar
  Stefan Milojević
  Jimmy Mitchell
  Allan Moore
  Flemming Nielsen
  Leif Nielsen
  Nacho Novo
  David O'Brien
  Garry O'Connor
  Alex O'Hara
  Jaakko Oksanen 
  Rabin Omar
  Neil Orr
  Tommy Orr
  Billy Osborne
  Thomas O'Ware
  Erik Paartalu
  Tomáš Peciar
  Mark Pickering
  Stuart Rafferty
  Marko Rajamäki
  Stan Rankin
  Brian Reid
  Stu Riddle
  Andy Ritchie
  Doug Robertson
  Jim Rooney
  Mark Russell
  Romario Sabajo
  Brian Schwake
  Stan Seymour
  Kenneth Skovdam
  Bernie Slaven
  Erik Sørensen
  Jørn Sørensen
  Billy Steel
  Morris Stevenson
  Robert Stevenson
  Robert Stewart
  Hugh Strachan
  Markus Sukalia
  Gerry Sweeney
  Henrik Terkelsen
  Bobby Thomson
  Kyle Thomson
  Børge Thorup
  Michael Tidser
  Jim Tolmie
  Jonathan Toto
  Tommy Turner
  Jani Uotinen
  Henk van Schaik
  Peter Weatherson
  John Whigham
  David Witteveen
  Jackie Wright
  David Wylie

Scottish Football Hall of Fame 
Ex-Morton players who have been inducted into the Scottish Football Hall of Fame are listed below.
Joe Jordan (2005)
Jimmy Cowan (2007)

For all Greenock Morton players with a Wikipedia article, see :Category:Greenock Morton F.C. players.

Board of directors

Managers 

This list does not contain caretaker managers.

  George Morell (1904–1908)
  Bob Cochrane (1908–1927)
  David Torrance (1928–1931)
  Bob Cochrane (1931–1934)
  Jackie Wright (1934–1938)
  Jimmy Davies (1939–1955)
  Gibby McKenzie (1955–1957)
  Jimmy McIntosh (1957–1960)
  Hal Stewart (1961–1972)
  Eric Smith (1972)
  Hal Stewart (1972–1974)
   Erik Sørensen (1974–1975)
  Joe Gilroy (1975–1976)
  Benny Rooney (1976–1983)
  Allan Feeney (1983)
  Tommy McLean (1983–1984)
  Willie McLean (1984–1985)
  Allan McGraw (1985–1997)
  Billy Stark (1997–2000)
  Ian McCall (2000)
  Allan Evans (2000–2001)
  Ally Maxwell (2001)
  Peter Cormack (2001–2002)
  Dave McPherson (2002)
  John McCormack (2002–2004)
  Jim McInally (2004–2008)
  Davie Irons (2008–2009)
  James Grady (2009–2010)
  Allan Moore (2010–2013)
  Kenny Shiels (2013–2014)
  Jim Duffy (2014–2018)
  Ray McKinnon (2018)
  Jonatan Johansson (2018–2019)
  David Hopkin (2019–2020)
  Gus MacPherson (2021)
  Dougie Imrie (2021–)

Scottish Cup record 
Morton first entered the Scottish Cup in 1877–78 season, and won it once in 1922. Over the course of Morton's time in the competition it has changed format seven times, to its current format of 8 rounds and 2 preliminary rounds.
 Between 2012–13 and 2014–15 there were 8 rounds plus a preliminary round.
 Between 2007–08 and 2011–12 there were 8 rounds.
 Between 1970–71 and 2006–07 there were 7 rounds.
 Between 1957–58 and 1969–70 there were 5 rounds plus a preliminary round.
 Between 1954–55 and 1956–57 there were 9 rounds.
 Between 1912–13 and 1953–54 there were 6 rounds.
 Between 1895–96 and 1911–12 there were 5 rounds.

So far Morton have finished the competition in the following rounds, this many times.
 Finals – 2 (last 1948)
 Semi-finals – 5 (last 1981)
 Quarter-finals – 15 (last 2018)

European record

References

External links 

 Official Website
 Greenock Morton Supporters Trust
 TonTastic Media Archive
 Morton BBC My Club page
 Complete History and Stats at FitbaStats

 
Football clubs in Scotland
Association football clubs established in 1874
Football in Inverclyde
1874 establishments in Scotland
Scottish Football League teams
Scottish Cup winners
Scottish Professional Football League teams
Greenock
Companies that have entered administration in the United Kingdom